The Legion of Mary (postnominal abbreviation L.O.M.) is an international association of members of the Catholic Church who serve it on a voluntary basis. It was founded in Dublin, as a Marian movement by the layman and civil servant Frank Duff.

Today, active and auxiliary (praying) members make up a total of over 10 million members worldwide, making it the largest apostolic organization of lay people in the Catholic Church.

Membership is highest in South Korea, Philippines, Brazil, Argentina and the Democratic Republic of Congo, which each have between 250,000 and 500,000 members.

Membership is open to those who belong to the Catholic Church and believe in its teaching. Its stated mission is for active members to serve God under the banner of Mary by the corporal and spiritual works of Mercy, as mentioned in Chapter 33 of the Legion of Mary Handbook. The main apostolate of the Legion is activities directed towards Catholics and non-Catholics encouraging them in their faith or inviting them to become Catholic. This is usually done by encouraging them in prayer, attending Mass and learning more about the Catholic faith. The members of the Legion are engaged primarily in the performance of spiritual works of mercy, rather than works of material aid.

History

The Legion of Mary was founded by Frank Duff on 7 September 1921 at Myra House, Francis Street, in Dublin. His idea was to help Catholic lay people fulfil their baptismal promises to be able to live their dedication to the Church in an organized structure, which would be supported by fraternity and prayer. The Legion draws its inspiration from Louis de Montfort's book True Devotion to Mary.

The Legion first started out by visiting women with cancer in hospitals, but it soon became active among the most destitute, notably among Dublin prostitutes. Duff subsequently laid down the system of the Legion in the Handbook of the Legion of Mary in 1928.

The Legion soon spread around the world. At first, it was often met with mistrust because of its then-unusual dedication to lay apostolate. After Pope Pius XI praised it in 1931, the Legion had its mistrust quelled.

Most prominent for spreading the legion was Edel Quinn (1907-1944) for her activities in Africa in the 1930s and the 1940s. Her dedication to the mission of the legion, even in the face of her ill health (tuberculosis) brought her great admiration inside and outside the legion. A beatification process is currently under way for the legendary Quinn, as well as for Duff and Alfie Lambe (1932–1959), the endearing Legion Envoy to South America.

On 27 March 2014, the Secretary of the Pontifical Council for the Laity, Bishop Josef Clemens, delivered the decree in which the Legion is recognized by the Holy See as International Association of the Faithful.

In 2021, the Legion celebrated the centennial of its founding, amidst the COVID-19 pandemic, by hosting virtual talks, devotions, and masses. The group also resolved to increase its membership and engagement among young people. Finally, group has continued to pray for the beatification of Servants of God Frank Duff, Alphonsus Lambe, and Venerable Edel Quin.

Structure

The basic unit of the Legion is called a Praesidium, which is normally based in a parish. The Praesidium, usually a group of 3–20 members, meets weekly in its parish. The Curia is the next level, each supervising several Praesidia.

The next level is the Comitium, which is in charge of several Curiae, usually over an area like a medium city or a part of a province. The next level is the Regia, which is in charge of larger territories like a province or state. The Senatus is the next level, and it generally has control over the Regiae in a very large area, usually a country or a very large territory for example Senatus of Uganda takes over the whole of Uganda.

The Concilium is the highest level and has its seat in Dublin. It has control over the whole Legion.

Each level of the Legion has the same officers: the President, the Vice-President, the Secretary, the Treasurer, and the Spiritual Director. The last is always in the clergy, but all other offices are held by the laity. All positions regardless of responsibility are voluntary and the Legion has no paid workers.

Membership

Entering and leaving 
Membership is open to all baptized Catholics. After visiting a Praesidium a few times, one can join the legion as a probationary member for three months. Then, a decision is made on whether to join the legion as an active member permanently.  During the probationary period, probationary members learn about the legion system by reading the Handbook of the Legion of Mary and its active works by listening to reports of active works undertaken by fellow legionaries. At the end of probationary period, members say an oath of "Legion promise", a pledge of allegiance to the Holy Spirit and to Mary, and become a permanent  active members.

Membership in the Legion of Mary is essentially based on discipline and commitment. Members devote their time and prayer for the intentions of Mary, Mother of God.

Members can withdraw from the Legion by informing the president of his or her praesidium.

Types of membership
The Legion of Mary consists of two totally different memberships: the active and the auxiliary members. Both are essential to the Legion: "Just as a bird cannot fly without one wing, so also the Legion cannot exist without any of the other members," said Ráinel Lobo of Mumbai, India.

Active members regularly attend the weekly sessions of their Praesidium and pray daily the prayer of the Legion, the Catena Legionis, which consists essentially of the Magnificat and some shorter prayers. Their main role lies in active apostolate for the legion and the church. Active members under 18 are not allowed to give the "Legion promise" until that age. They are considered Juniors and may hold any office except President in their Praesidium. Above the level of the Praesidium, no Junior may serve as an officer.

Auxiliary members support the legion through their prayer. They pray the whole booklet of Legion prayers, the "Tessera", every day. The Tessera consists of the Invocation, prayers to the Holy Spirit, the Rosary, the Catena, and the concluding prayers of the Tessera.

Praetorians, a higher grade of active membership, pray, in addition to their duties as active members, the Rosary, the Divine Office and go to Holy Mass daily.

Adjutorians, a higher grade of auxiliary membership, additionally pray the Divine Office and go to Holy Mass daily.

Praetorians and Adjutors do not have higher status or higher rank inside the legion system. The meaning of the grades is only a desire for a more devotional life, not for higher status. Entering the grade is done by registering with a list of Praetorians/Adjutors and by subsequently observing their duties.

Meetings

The Praesidia normally meet weekly; larger entities normally monthly or more rarely.

For all sessions, the Altar of the Legion is set up. It has a statue of the Virgin Mary (represented standing on a globe, her arms extended, crushing the serpent with her foot), which is placed on a white tablecloth, which has "Legio Mariae" written on it. On the two sides of the statue are placed two vases with flowers, often roses (the flower connected with Mary). On the front ends of the cloth are two candlesticks with burning candles. On the right side of Mary, the Vexillum Legionis is placed.

During meetings, all the prayers of the Tessera are said. The sessions start out with the introductory prayers to the Holy Spirit and to Mary. They include five decades of the Rosary. The next part of the session includes a spiritual reading and administrative matters. The members tell briefly how they fulfilled their tasks assigned to them at the previous session. They also discuss and/or read a chapter from the Handbook of the Legion. Then, the Catena Legionis is prayed, and the Spiritual Director or, if absent, the President holds a short sermon about spiritual matters (allocutio). Finally, the new tasks for the legionaries are distributed. Each meeting ends with the concluding prayers of the Tessera and a prayer for Duff's beatification.

Vexillium Legionis
The Vexillum Legionis (English:the standard of the legion) is placed. The vexillum is made out of metal and onyx and shows the Holy Spirit in the form of a dove as well as the Miraculous Medal.

Spirituality

The spirituality of the Legion of Mary is essentially based on the approach of Louis de Montfort, as put forward in his True Devotion to Mary. The book promotes a "total dedication" to Christ through devotion to the Blessed Virgin Mary, which later influenced popes such as John Paul II, who mentions it in an apostolic letter, Rosarium Virginis Mariae.

Another important element that shapes its spirituality is Duff's devotion to the Holy Spirit. He promoted the adoration of the third person of the Trinity, which he considered neglected. He saw the Virgin Mary as the "visible image" of the Spirit; the Legion's introductory prayers and legion promise are directed to the Holy Spirit. The Legion's vexillium legionis bears the Holy Spirit's image in the form of a dove.

The essential aim of the Legion of Mary is the sanctification of its members through prayer, the sacraments and devotion to Mary and the Trinity, and of the whole world through the apostolate of the Legion.

The idea of a Catholic lay apostolate organization where ordinary laypeople in all situations of life would work for their own sanctification and for the conversion of the world was the first of its kind. After the Second Vatican Council (1962–65) promoted such ideas in its conciliar documents, this approach gain wider acceptance in the Catholic Church.

See also

 Frank Duff
 Alfie Lambe
 Edel Quinn
 Laureana Franco
 Blue Army of Our Lady of Fátima

References

External links
 Concilium of the Legion of Mary, official site
 Map of Legion of Mary in the United States
 Brazilian site of the Legion of Mary 
 Legion of Mary, USA
  Phoenix, AZ Diocese Comitium site
  Spanish Legion of Mary site
 Legion of Mary, Mexico
 Legion of  Mary, Ottawa, Canada
 Legion of  Mary, Uganda, Africa

Note 
 Learn about the development of the Legion of Mary in the Ottawa Archdiocese HERE

1921 establishments in Ireland
International associations of the faithful
Catholic organizations established in the 20th century
Christian organizations established in 1921